Elections to Ballymena Borough Council were held on 18 May 1977 on the same day as the other Northern Irish local government elections. The election used four district electoral areas to elect a total of 21 councillors.

Election results

Note: "Votes" are the first preference votes.

Districts summary

|- class="unsortable" align="centre"
!rowspan=2 align="left"|Ward
! % 
!Cllrs
! % 
!Cllrs
! %
!Cllrs
! %
!Cllrs
!rowspan=2|TotalCllrs
|- class="unsortable" align="center"
!colspan=2 bgcolor="" | DUP
!colspan=2 bgcolor="" | UUP
!colspan=2 bgcolor="" | Alliance
!colspan=2 bgcolor="white"| Others
|-
|align="left"|Area A
|bgcolor="#D46A4C"|36.6
|bgcolor="#D46A4C"|2
|28.3
|1
|0.0
|0
|35.1
|1
|4
|-
|align="left"|Area B
|N/A
|4
|N/A
|2
|N/A
|0
|N/A
|0
|6
|-
|align="left"|Area C
|bgcolor="#D46A4C"|50.5
|bgcolor="#D46A4C"|3
|13.3
|0
|0.0
|0
|36.2
|2
|5
|-
|align="left"|Area D
|bgcolor="#D46A4C"|34.3
|bgcolor="#D46A4C"|2
|18.4
|1
|12.0
|1
|35.3
|2
|6
|-
|- class="unsortable" class="sortbottom" style="background:#C9C9C9"
|align="left"| Total
|40.1
|11
|19.5
|4
|5.2
|1
|35.2
|5
|21
|-
|}

Districts results

Area A

1973: 2 x UUP, 1 x DUP, 1 x Independent
1977: 2 x DUP, 1 x UUP, 1 x Independent
1973-1977 Change: DUP gain from UUP

Area B

1973: 2 x DUP, 2 x Independent Unionist, 1 x UUP, 1 x Independent
1977: 4 x DUP, 2 x UUP
1973-1977 Change: DUP (two seats) gain from UUP and Independent, Independent Unionists (two seats) join UUP

As only six candidates had been nominated for six seats, there was no vote in Area B and all six candidates were deemed elected.

Area C

1973: 3 x UUP, 1 x DUP, 1 x Vanguard
1977: 3 x DUP, 2 x Independent Unionist
1973-1977 Change: DUP gain from UUP, Independent Unionists (two seats) leave UUP and Vanguard

Area D

1973: 3 x UUP, 1 x DUP, 1 x Alliance, 1 x Independent
1977: 2 x DUP, 1 x UUP, 1 x Alliance, 1 x Independent, 1 x Independent Unionist
1973-1977 Change: DUP gain from UUP, Independent Unionist leaves UUP

References

Ballymena Borough Council elections
Ballymena